Dan Chameroy (born November 12, 1970) is a Canadian actor.

Personal life

Raised by French parents in Edmonton, Dan started his career competing in vocal competitions in Canada and America.

He is married to actress Christine Donato. They met in 1991 in the production of Les Miserables. They have one daughter.

Theatre credits

He made his Toronto stage debut in 1991 as part of the Canadian cast of Les Miserables at The Royal Alexandra Theatre.

He is a Dora Award winner for his performance of Gaston in Disney's Beauty and the Beast at Princess of Wales Theatre

Part of the Pre Broadway cast of The Drowsy Chaperone at the Winter Garden Theatre (Toronto)

Has appeared in seven Ross Petty Pantomimes as his comic creation Plumbum at the Elgin Theatre (Toronto).

Spent 14 seasons at The Stratford Festival playing a variety of roles.

Has been a member of Soulpepper and The Shaw Festival ensembles and has worked across Canada and the United States.

He appeared as Bobby in a production of Stephen Sondhiem's "Company" directed by Gary Griffin with a cast that included Brent Carver, Louise Pitre, Nia Vardalos and may other Canadian theatre luminaries.

He played Agatha Trunchbull in the Toronto and US National tour of Matilda the Musical and received a Toronto Theatre Critics Award.

In 2013, he played the title character in the Soulpepper Theatre Company's adaptation of The Barber of Seville.

In 2017, Dan played Miss Trunchbull in the North American Tour of Matilda the Musical.

In 2018, Dan returned to Stratford and played Dr. Frank-n-Furter in The Rocky Horror Show. The run was extended three times and completed its final performance on 2 December 2018, making it the longest running show in Stratford Festival history. In 2019 he appears as Jackie Elliot in Billy Elliot and Orin Scrivello the dentist in Little Shop of Horrors. He returned to Stratford in 2022 as Billy Flynn in Chicago.

Dan is currently in playing Antipholus of Ephesus/Phil Sullivan in A Comedy Of Errors for the Chicago Shakespeare Theatre directed by Barbara Gaines and will next be seen as Count Carl-Magnus Malcolm in Little Night Music opposite Eric McCormack, Cynthia Dale, Chilina Kennedy and Fiona Reid.

Television and film

Dan created and stars in the web series Leer Estates on (stratfest@home). Season 2 is being released this summer 2023.

Dan appeared in two seasons of Little Men on PaxTV as Laurie Lawrence, a philanthropist and husband to Amy March (Amy Price Francis) in the continuing stories of Louisa May Alcott's Little Women.

He has had several reoccurring roles on television most recently The CW's Reign as Lord Lionel Byrd.

Dan has been active in voice work. Credits include D.N. Ace, Go Away Unicorn!, PAW Patrol, Ranger Rob, Rusty Rivets, Norman Picklestripes, Fangbone!, The ZhuZhus, Ollie's Pack Oh No! It's an Alien Invasion, Cloudy with a Chance of Meatballs, Looped, Babar and the Adventures of Badou, The Day My Butt Went Psycho, Thomas and Friends: All Engines Go! as Beresford in the US, Hotel Transylvania: The Series as Aunt Lydia, Fluffy in Agent Binky: Pets of the Universe, Let's Go Luna! as Sam Hopper & Work It Out Wombats! as Kit. He is also on Maggie and the Ferocious Beast as Reggie.

Other work
Other Theatre: 13 seasons with Stratford, including Outside Looking In, Wanderlust, The Winter's Tale, A Funny Thing Happened..., Pentecost, Oklahoma, Palmer Park, Cymbeline, Camelot, The Arsonists (Canadian Stage Company); The Magic Fire, High Society (Shaw); The Drowsy Chaperone, Beauty and the Beast, Les Misérables (Mirvish). Nightwood, Theatre Aquarius, Citadel Theatre, Talk is Free, MTC, Theatre Calgary, and Neptune Theatre. Dan recently completed his 5th pantomime at The Elgin Theatre.

Other: Dora Award recipient and nominee, Stratford Conservatory, Founding Artist of Theatre 20.

Nominations

Three time (Canadian Screen Award) Nominee for his performances in the animated series Hotel Transylvania and Oh No! It’s an Alien Invasion

Nominated for (Dora Awards) for his performances in Life After, Matilda, The Wild Party and Into the Woods.

Asides

He released a CD of Broadway show tunes entitles "me" in 2003 and can be heard in the cast recording of Tristan.

References

External links
 

Living people
1968 births
Male actors from Edmonton
Canadian male television actors
Canadian male film actors
Canadian male voice actors